The T58 class were a group of minesweepers built for the Soviet Navy in the 1950s. The Soviet designation was Project 264.

Design

The specification for these ships was issued in 1949 and the lead ship was completed in 1957. These ships were larger than the previous T43 class and had increased sweep capacity and were fitted with more advanced mechanical, acoustic and magnetic sweeps. Heavier self-defence weapons were also fitted. The ships had steel hulls and were powered by three diesel engines (which were located on two levels to minimise length). No special provision was made to minimise acoustic or pressure signature. The ships were also fitted to operate in an NBC environment.

Variants

 Project 254 A – built from 1958 - Improved silencing and degaussing gear, new sonar and radar, 30 mm guns instead of 25 mm and RBU-2500 anti-submarine mortars
 Radar Picket version - 3 units converted early 1970s. Fitted with P-10 air search radar installation aft replacing one twin 57 mm gun turret
 Patrol ship - 19 units transferred to the Border Guard, served until the early 1990s
 Valdai-class submarine rescue ship - 7 units fitted with diving support equipment

Ships

45 ships were built between 1957 and 1962. All were scrapped by the early 1990s.

See also
List of ships of the Soviet Navy
List of ships of Russia by project number

References

 Also published as 
Page in Russian Language
  All T58 Class Minesweepers - Complete Ship List

Mine warfare vessel classes
Minesweepers of the Soviet Navy